Salmo cettii, or the Mediterranean trout, is a species of trout, a freshwater fish in the family Salmonidae. It lives in the Mediterranean region in Corsica, Sardinia, Sicily, and on the Italian mainland in the Magra drainage and further south. It is a nonmigratory fish which lives in streams and in karstic resurgences. It is sometimes referred to Salmo trutta macrostigma, which depending on concept is either a more widespread Mediterranean taxon, or a taxon endemic to Algeria.

References

cetti
Fauna of Italy
Freshwater fish of Europe
Near threatened animals
Fish described in 1810
Taxa named by Constantine Samuel Rafinesque